Regina Pütz (born 13 April 1950) is a German volleyball player. She competed in the women's tournament at the 1972 Summer Olympics.

References

1950 births
Living people
German women's volleyball players
Olympic volleyball players of West Germany
Volleyball players at the 1972 Summer Olympics
Sportspeople from Bonn